Angelakos is a surname. Notable people with the surname include:

 Diogenes Angelakos (1919–1997), American professor of electronic engineering
 Michael Angelakos (born 1987), American musician, singer, songwriter and record producer

Greek-language surnames